The football tournament at the 1986 Brunei Merdeka Games was held from July 19 to 27 in Bandar Seri Begawan, Brunei.  The tournament was also referred to as the Sultan Hassanal Bolkiah Cup, or the second Brunei Pesta Sukan Cup.

Teams 
It is likely that the Philippines team was the full national team, but it is unknown.  the Malaysian Tigers was a developmental team of young players, functioning as a national B team. The precise designation of the Thai team is unknown, but it was not the full Thailand national team (which was at the Merdeka Tournament in Kuala Lumpur).  The Singapore team was composed of Malaysia Cup and intermediate squad players.  However, the Singapore 2–0 Thailand match is listed by FIFA as a full international. No other match from this tournament is listed as such.

Group stage

Group A

Group B

Knockout stage

Semi-finals

Bronze medal match

Gold medal match

References 
General
Morrison, Neil. "Brunei Merdeka Games 1986". RSSSF.

Specific

Brunei
1985
1986 in Brunei
1986 in Singaporean football
1986 in Malaysian football
1986 in Thai sport